Harold Barns White (15 January 1901 – 1983) was an English footballer who played in the Football League for Southend United. He played mainly at left-half, but also appeared as a centre-forward.

Born in Manor Park, London, White played cricket and football in Leigh-on-Sea, the latter with Southend and District League club Leigh Ramblers, where he scored 50 goals during the 1920–21 season.

White joined Southend United for the 1921–22 season. He made four appearances in the Third Division South in his two seasons with the club. He joined Grays Thurrock United in 1925. He was appointed as Grays Thurrock manager in June 1929.

Notes

References

1901 births
1983 deaths
People from Manor Park, London
Footballers from the London Borough of Newham
Sportspeople from Essex
English footballers
Association football wing halves
Association football forwards
Southend United F.C. players
Grays Thurrock United F.C. players
English Football League players
English football managers